Monroeville High School is a public high school in Monroeville, Ohio.  It is the only high school in the Monroeville Local Schools district.  Their nickname is the Eagles.  They are members of the Firelands Conference.

Ohio High School Athletic Association State Championships
 Boys Basketball – 1984
 Wrestling - 2010

League championships

Baseball: 1964, 1965, 1967, 1968, 1969, 1971, 1972, 1973
Boys Basketball: 1963–64, 1964–65, 1967–68, 1971–72, 1974–75, 1975–76, 1982–83, 1983–84
Girls Basketball: 1978-79
Boys Cross Country: 1984
Girls Cross Country:
Football: 1963, 1978, 1985, 1987, 1988, 1992, 1998, 2002, 2004, 2006
Softball:
Boys Track and Field: 2003, 2004, 2007, 2008
Girls Track and Field:
Volleyball: 1986, 1988, 2011
Wrestling: 1997, 1998, 2000

Alumni
 Logan Stieber, 4x State Champion wrestler; 4x NCAA Champion at Ohio State

Notes and references

External links
 District Website

High schools in Huron County, Ohio
Public high schools in Ohio